The 2013 Harvard Crimson football team represented Harvard University in the 2013 NCAA Division I FCS football season. They were led by 20th-year head coach Tim Murphy and played their home games at Harvard Stadium. They were a member of the Ivy League. They finish with a record of 9–1 overall and 6–1 in Ivy League play to share the Ivy League title with Princeton. Harvard averaged 12,066 fans per game.

Schedule

Ranking movements

References

Harvard
Harvard Crimson football seasons
Ivy League football champion seasons
Harvard Crimson football
Harvard Crimson football